Rudolf Zöhrer (28 March 1911 – 12 February 2000) was an Austrian football goalkeeper. He played for three caps for Austria. Zöhrer also played for FC Admira Wacker Mödling and FK Austria Wien, Wiener AC, SK Donaufeld Wien and Floridsdorfer AC.

References

External links 
 

1911 births
2000 deaths
Footballers from Vienna
Austrian footballers
Austria international footballers
Association football goalkeepers
FC Admira Wacker Mödling players
FK Austria Wien players